Pauline Roussin-Bouchard (born 5 July 2000) is a French professional golfer. She was number one in the World Amateur Golf Ranking for 34 weeks in 2020.

Amateur career
Roussin represented the French National Team from age 14 and won the 2015 European Young Masters both individually and with her team. She played in two Espirito Santo Trophies (2016 and 2018) and six European Girls' Team Championship and European Ladies' Team Championships, winning silver in 2018. 

She representied Europe at the 2016 Junior Ryder Cup and was on the winning Vagliano Trophy team in 2019. She won the 2020 Arnold Palmer Cup with the international team.

Roussin enrolled at the University of South Carolina in 2019 to play golf with the South Carolina Gamecocks. She had the best season for a freshman in program history and won five times in her first two years.

Roussin won the Spanish International Stroke Play and St Rule Trophy in 2016, and the Grand Prix de Valcros in 2017. In 2018 she was runner-up at the Swiss International Ladies Championship and Grand Prix de ligue PACA Dames, and won the Grand Prix de Valgarde.

In 2019, she won The Spirit International Amateur Golf Championship with France. She played in the Ladies European Tour event Jabra Ladies Open and was one stroke clear of the field heading into the final round, finishing runner-up as England's Annabel Dimmock won by one shot. The top two finish qualified her for the 2019 Evian Championship.

Roussin reached number 1 in the World Amateur Golf Ranking in January 2020. She made her U.S. Open debut at the 2020 U.S. Women's Open by virtue of her WAGR rank. She made the cut and finished T46.

Professional career
Roussin turned professional in August 2021 and claimed a victory in just her second event as a professional, the Skaftö Open on the Ladies European Tour, two weeks after she ended life as an amateur, where she shot a second round of 60 (−9).

Roussin earned her card for the 2022 LPGA Tour through qualifying school.

Amateur wins
2015 Grand Prix de Valcros, European Young Masters (individual)
2016 Spanish International Stroke Play, St Rule Trophy
2017 Grand Prix de Valcros
2018 Grand Prix de Valgarde
2019 Windy City Collegiate Championship, Portuguese International Ladies Amateur Championship, Grand Prix de ligue PACA Dames, Italian International Ladies Amateur Championship
2020 The Ally
2021 Moon Golf Invitational, Valspar Augusta Invitational, SEC Women's Golf Championship

Professional wins (2)

Ladies European Tour wins (2)

Results in LPGA majors
Results not in chronological order.

CUT = missed the half-way cut
NT = no tournament
T = tied

Team appearances
Amateur
European Young Masters (representing France): 2015 (winners)
Junior Ryder Cup (representing Europe): 2016
Espirito Santo Trophy (representing France): 2016, 2018 
European Girls' Team Championship (representing France): 2016, 2017
European Ladies' Team Championship (representing France): 2018, 2019, 2020, 2021
The Spirit International Amateur Golf Championship (representing France): 2019 (winners)
Vagliano Trophy (representing the Continent of Europe): 2019 (winners)
Arnold Palmer Cup: 2020 (winners), 2021

References

External links

French female golfers
South Carolina Gamecocks women's golfers
Ladies European Tour golfers
LPGA Tour golfers
Sportspeople from Toulon
2000 births
Living people
21st-century French women